Jami'a Nooriyya is an Arabic College, or an educational institute of higher religious learning, the equivalent of north Indian madrasa, located at Pattikkad, near Perinthalmanna in Malappuram district, Kerala. Established in 1963 by Samastha Kerala Jam'iyyat al-'Ulama', it is the premier orthodox or traditionalist Sunni-Shafi'i institution for the training of the Islamic scholars in Kerala.

Jami'a Nooriyya is managed by Samastha Kerala Jam'iyyat al-'Ulama', the principal Sunni-Shafi'i scholarly body in Kerala. The institute carries forward the old Ponnani tradition of scholar training. The Nizami curriculum used at Jami'a Nooriyya is a modified version of the syllabus utilized at the al-Baqiyyat-us-Salihat College at Vellore (with Shafi'i Law for Hanafi Law).

Jami'a Nooriyya celebrates its anniversary in February–March of every year.

Faculties 
Source: http://jamianooriya.in/faculties/

 Principal: K. Alikutty Musliyar
 Professors
 M. K. Moideen Kutty Musliyar Kottumala
 Latheef Faizy Pathiramanna 
 E. Hamza  Faizy Al Haithami Nenmini
 K. T. Muhammed Ali Shihab Faizy Koomanna
 P. Sulaiman Faizy Chungathara
 Liyaudheen Faizy Melmuri
 Umer Faizy Mudikkode
 O. T. Musthafa Faizy Mudikkode

References

External links
 
Website of Students' Association

Islam in Kerala
Institutes of higher Islamic learning in Kerala
Higher education
Islamic education